John Chappel Woodhouse  (1749 – 17 November 1833) was an English Anglican priest who was Archdeacon of Salop from 17 October 1798 until 24 December 1821; and Dean of Lichfield from 1807 until his death.

Woodhouse was born at Lichfield, son of William, a physician, and his wife, Mary Mompesson, granddaughter and heiress of William Chappel. He was educated at Christ Church, Oxford.  He held incumbencies at Donnington, Shropshire and Stoke on Trent.

In 1849, he published Woodhouse's Annotations on the Apocalypse, which was well received. He married Mercy Peate (or Peet), with whom he had a son, Chappel Woodhouse (1780–1815), who married Amelia Oakeley, daughter of Sir Charles Oakeley, 1st Baronet; and two daughters, Ellen Jane and Mary Anne. His daughter Ellen marriaged firstly, Rev. William Robinson, Rector of Swinnerton; secondly, Hugh Dyke Acland, second son of Sir Thomas Dyke Acland, 9th Baronet; and thirdly, Richard Hinckley of Beacon House, Lichfield.
 
Woodhouse died on 17 November 1833.

Bibliography

Notes

References

18th-century English Anglican priests
19th-century English Anglican priests
1749 births
1833 deaths
People from Lichfield
Alumni of Christ Church, Oxford
Archdeacons of Salop
Deans of Lichfield